Sæbø is a village in the municipality of Ørsta, Møre og Romsdal, Norway.  The village is located along the Hjørundfjorden, at the eastern end of the Bondalen valley, through which it connects to the town of Ørsta, the administrative centre of the municipality, via Norwegian County Road 655 (Fv655).

The village of Urke is nearly due east, on the opposite side of Hjørundfjorden, on the north shore of the Norangsfjorden arm; the two villages are connected by ferry, which serves as a link between the eastern and western sections of Fv655.

Sæbø was the administrative centre of the former municipality of Hjørundfjord, which was incorporated into Ørsta in 1964.

References

Villages in Møre og Romsdal
Ørsta